Julio Illescas (born 23 May 1962) is a Guatemalan former cyclist. He competed in the team time trial at the 1988 Summer Olympics.

References

1962 births
Living people
Guatemalan male cyclists
Olympic cyclists of Guatemala
Cyclists at the 1988 Summer Olympics
Place of birth missing (living people)